Hoshiarpur district is a district of Punjab state in northern India. Hoshiarpur, one of the oldest districts of Punjab, is located in the North-east part of the Punjab state and shares common boundaries with Gurdaspur district in the north-west, Jalandhar district and Kapurthala district in south-west, Kangra district and Una district of Himachal Pradesh in the north-east. Hoshiarpur district comprises 4 sub-divisions, 10 community development blocks, 9 urban local bodies and 1417 villages. The district has an area of 3365 km2. and a population of 1,586,625 persons as per census 2011.

Hoshiarpur along with the districts of Nawanshehar, Kapurthala and parts of Jalandhar represents one of the cultural region of Punjab called Doaba or the Bist Doab - the tract of land between two rivers namely Beas and Sutlej. The area along with the Shivalik foothills on the right side of Chandigarh-Pathankot road in Hoshiarpur is submountainous and this part of the district is also known as Kandi area. The two rivers, Sutlej and Beas along with two other seasonal streams provide drainage to the region. Besides these, the Kandi region is full of seasonal streams.

Hoshiarpur district falls into two nearly equal portions of hill and plain country. Its eastern face consists of the westward slope of the Solar Singhi Hills; parallel with that ridge, a line of lower heights belonging to the Siwalik Range traverses the district from south to north, while between the two chains stretches a valley of uneven width, known as the Jaswan Dun. Its upper portion is crossed by the Sohan torrent, while the Sutlej sweeps into its lower end through a break in the hills, and flows in a southerly direction until it turns the flank of the central range, and debouches westwards upon the plains. This western plain consists of alluvial formation, with a general westerly slope owing to the deposit of silt from the mountain torrents in the sub-montane tract. The Beas has a fringe of lowland, open to moderate but not excessive inundations, and considered very fertile. A considerable area is covered by government woodlands, under the care of the forest department. Rice is largely grown, in the marshy flats along the banks of the Beas. The district, owing to its proximity to the hills, possesses a comparatively cool and humid climate. Cotton fabrics are manufactured, and sugar, rice, other grains and indigo are among the exports.

Hoshiarpur is also known as a City of Saints. There are many deras in this district. Several religious fairs are held, at Anandpur Sahib, Dasuya, Mukerian and Chintpurni, all of which attract an enormous concourse of people. 

The District Govt. College was once a campus for Punjab University, and it was predominantly inhabited by Gujjar and Saini, Dogras of Jammu-Punjab Region during the reign of the Sikh Empire.

History 
The area of present Hoshiarpur District was also part of Indus Valley Civilization. Recent excavations at various sites in the district have revealed that the entire area near the Shivalik foothills was selected for habitation not only by the early Paleolithic man but also by those in the protohistoric and historic periods. The legends associate several places in the district with Pandavas. Dasuya is mentioned in epic of Mahabharata as the seat of Raja Virata in whose services the Pandavas remained for thirteen years during their exile. Bham, about 11 km west of Mahilpur, is said to be the place where the Pandavas passed their exile. Lasara, about 19 km north of Jaijon, also contains a stone temple stated to date back to the time of Pandavas. According to the Chinese pilgrim, Hieun Tsang, the area of Hoshiarpur was dominated by a tribe of Chandrabansi Rajputs, who maintained an independent existence for centuries before the Muhammadan conquest.

The country around Hoshiarpur formed part of the old kingdom of Katoch in Jalandhar. The state was eventually broken up, and the present district was divided between the, rajas of Datarpur and Jaswan. They retained undisturbed possession of their territories until 1759, when the rising Sikh chieftains commenced a series of encroachments upon the hill tracts. In 1815 Maharaja Ranjit Singh, forced the ruler of Jaswan to resign his territories in exchange for an estate on feudal tenure; three years later the raja of Datarpur met with similar treatment. By the close of the year 1818 the whole country from the Sutlej to the Beas had come under the government of Lahore, and after the First Anglo-Sikh War in 1846 passed to the British government. The deposed rajas of Datarpur and Jaswan received cash pensions from the new rulers, but expressed bitter disappointment at not being restored to their former sovereign position. Accordingly, the outbreak of the Second Anglo-Sikh War, in 1848 found the disaffected chieftains ready for rebellion. They organized a revolt, but the two rajas and the other ringleaders were captured, and their estates confiscated. Hoshiarpur is an ancient centre of Hindu epics and culture itself. In Bajwara (4 km east on Una Road from the present city) ruins of an ancient culture can still be found. Mythologically, Teh Dasuya of this district is estimated to be King Virat's kingdom where Pandavas spent their one-year exile.

Bhrigu Samhita 
Hoshiarpur is also popular for old astrological facts where it is said to be that old documents where past, present and future birth of every person is written in detail, are safely kept at this place. Many people  visit Hoshiarpur to find out about their past, present and future in every birth they have or had taken in the past.

Significant cities
Among the numerous ancient cultural centers in Hoshiarpur was town Jaijon. Said to be Founded by Jaijjat rishi around 11th century at the Shivalik foothills, Jaijon was a flourishing trade centre. It was also known as a centre for oriental studies. Noted scholars and exponents of Sanskrit, Astrology, Ayurveda and music visited this place for meeting. Music composers Pandit Husan Lal and Bhagat Ram and noted Pakistani poet Tufail Hoshiarpuri belonged to the same place. Jaijon also have a small old railway station from the British era.

Ayurveda scholar Pandit Govind Ram Vatsyayan and Sanskrit laureate Acharya Vishwanath belonged to Jaijon.

Mahilpur is an ancient village on the feet of Shivalik which was visited by Chinese Hiuen Tsang who wrote this village as Sri Mahipalpur in his notes.

Demographics
According to the 2011 census Hoshiarpur district has a population of 1,586,625, roughly equal to the nation of Gabon or the US state of Idaho. This gives it a ranking of 310th in India (out of a total of 640). 
Its population growth rate over the decade 2001-2011 was 17.95%. Hoshiarpur has a sex ratio of 961 females for every 1000 males, and a literacy rate of 85.40%. Scheduled Castes made up 35.14% of the population.

The Hoshiarpur district has one of the highest Scheduled Caste population (34%) population in Punjab. The Hoshiarpur-I and Hoshiarpur-II have 48 percent Scheduled Castes population. In Mahilpur block the proportion of Scheduled Castes population is 44 percent and in Bhunga block it is 41 percent while in the remaining blocks the proportion of Scheduled Castes population is less than 40 percent.

Religion

Language

At the time of the 2011 census, 93.74% of the population spoke Punjabi and 5.27% Hindi as their first language.

Economy
In 2006 the Ministry of Panchayati Raj named Hoshiarpur one of the country's 250 most backward districts (out of a total of 640). It is the only district in Punjab currently receiving funds from the Backward regions Grant Fund Programme (BRGF).

Government and politics

Politics

District administration
 The Deputy Commissioner, an officer belonging to the Indian Administrative Service, is in-charge of the General Administration in the district, and is assisted by a number of officers belonging to Punjab Civil Service and other Punjab state services.
 The Senior Superintendent of Police, an officer belonging to the Indian Police Service, is responsible for maintaining law & order in the district, assisted by the officers of the Punjab Police Service and other Punjab police officials.
 The Divisional Forest Officer, an officer belonging to the Indian Forest Service, is responsible for the management of the forests, environment and wildlife in the district and is assisted by the officers of the Punjab Forest Service and other Punjab forest officials and Punjab wildlife officials.
 Sectoral development is looked after by the district head/officer of each development department such as PWD, Health, Education, Agriculture, Animal husbandry, etc. These officers are from various Punjab state services.

Sub-Divisions
The District of Hoshiarpur comprises four sub-divisions, ten development blocks, eight municipal councils and one notified area committee, as listed below:

Administrative Divisions
 Hoshiarpur
 Dasuya
 Mukerian
 Garhshankar

Development Blocks
 Hoshiarpur-I
 Hoshiarpur-II
 Bhunga
 Tanda
 Dasuya
 Mukerian
 Talwara
 Hajipur
 Garhshankar

Municipal Corporation
Hoshiarpur

Municipal Councils
 Garhdiwala
 Hariana
 Tanda
 Mahilpur
 Garhshankar
 Dasuya'
 Mukerian
 Sham Chaurasi
 Talwara

Notified Area Committee
 Mahilpur
 Hoshiarpur
 Shamchurasi Kadiana

Notable people from Hoshiarpur District

Politics

Jai Krishan of Garhshankar Deputy Speaker in current Punjab Legislative Assembly
Kewal Krishan of Mukerian(10 October 1923 – 30 June 2008)  Speaker of the Punjab Legislative Assembly (Vidhan Sabha), Minister of Finance in the Punjab Government 1980–83
Mangu Ram Mugowalia, prominent Ghadar Party leader and Freedom Fighter
 Harnam Singh Saini, an Indian revolutionary
 Giani Zail Singh was elected from Hoshiarpur in 1980. After that he became Union Home Minister and later the President of India in 1982. 
 Avinash Rai Khanna a Bharatiya Janata Party leader 
 Santosh Chowdhary ex-MP Congress.
 Mayawati incontested M.P. election from Hoshiarpur 1989 Indian general election
 Ambika Soni M.P. belongs to bajwara in Hoshiarpur. 
 Jagjit Singh Chauhan founder of Khalsa Raj Party
 Rana Muhammad Hanif Khan Federal Minister of Finance, Pakistan (22 October 1974 – 28 March 1977) was born in Garhshankar, District Hoshiarpur
 Vijay Sampla, (Minister of State for Social Justice and Empowerment) MP from Hoshiarpur is actually from Jalandhar city. (born at Sofi Village, Jalandhar district).
 Harjit Singh Sajjan, Minister of National Defence for the Government of Canada

Arts and culture

 Bhai Sahib Singh one of the Panj Pyare
 Gauri Khan (born Gauri Chhibber) belongs to Hoshiarpur and raised up in Delhi.
 Simran Kaur Mundi a Punjabi film actress is from village Mundian Jattan
 Yo Yo Honey Singh Punjabi Rapper from Delhi was born in Hoshiarpur.
 Monica Bedi a Punjabi actress is from village Chabbewal 
 Piara Singh Gill, nuclear physicist 
 Kulwinder Dhillon singer from Mahilpur
 Amar Singh Shaunki Dhadi singer
 Hard Kaur Indian rapper
 D. P. Singh a science populariser and environmental activist of Punjab.
 Satinder Sartaaj Punjabi singer born in Bajrawar village, Hoshiarpur District
 Dr.Ganda Singh a Punjabi historian
 Intikhab Alam cricket player.
 Harbanse Singh Doman belongs to Hoshiarpur
 Ustad Amanat Ali Khan Pakistani classic and ghazal singer was born in Hoshiarpur
 Habib Jalib Pakistani revolutionary poet and left wing politician born in a village near Hoshiarpur.
 Upasana Singh actress in Bollywood and comedian in TV was born in Tanda.
 Nachhatar Gill Punjabi singer born in Vill. Akalgarh, near Garhshankar, Dist. Hoshiarpur.
Mickey Singh, US based Punjabi Urban singer belongs to Hoshiarpur
Jaz Dhami, UK based Punjabi singer belongs to Hoshiarpur
Manmohan Waris, Punjabi folk singer belongs to Halluwal (near Mahilpur) District Hoshiarpur

Army 

Tufail Mohammad of Punjab Regiment (Pakistan), Recipient of Nishan-e-Haider
Fazal Din of 7th Battalion 10th Baluch Regiment, British Indian Army, recipient of Victoria Cross.

References

External links 
 Hoshiarpur district
 Hoshiarpur District at Maps of India

 
Districts of Punjab, India